Shelby County is a county located in the far eastern portion of the U.S. state of Texas. As of the 2020 census, its population was 24,022. Its county seat is Center. The county was established in 1835 as a municipality of Mexico and organized as a county in 1837. It is named for Isaac Shelby, a soldier in the American Revolution who became the first governor of Kentucky.

History
Shelby County was established in 1837. It was named for Isaac Shelby, a soldier from Tennessee during the American Revolution, and first Governor of Kentucky.

Geography

Adjacent counties and parishes
 Panola County (north)
 De Soto Parish, Louisiana (northeast)
 Sabine Parish, Louisiana (east)
 Sabine County (south)
 San Augustine County (south)
 Nacogdoches County (southwest)
 Rusk County (northwest)

National protected area
 Sabine National Forest (part)

Demographics

Note: the US Census treats Hispanic/Latino as an ethnic category. This table excludes Latinos from the racial categories and assigns them to a separate category. Hispanics/Latinos can be of any race.

As of the census of 2000,  25,224 people, 9,595 households, and 6,908 families resided in the county.  The population density was 32 people per square mile (12/km2).  The 11,955 housing units averaged 15 per square mile (6/km2).  The racial makeup of the county was 72.65% White, 19.44% African American, 0.36% Native American, 0.23% Asian, 0.02% Pacific Islander, 5.87% from other races, and 1.44% from two or more races.  About 9.87% of the population was Hispanic or Latino of any race.

Of the 9,595 households, 32.40% had children under the age of 18 living with them, 55.10% were married couples living together, 12.90% had a female householder with no husband present, and 28.00% were notfamilies.  About 25.40% of all households were made up of individuals, and 13.60% had someone living alone who was 65 years of age or older.  The average household size was 2.59 and the average family size was 3.08.

In the county, the population was distributed as 26.60% under the age of 18, 8.80% from 18 to 24, 25.80% from 25 to 44, 22.20% from 45 to 64, and 16.60% who were 65 years of age or older.  The median age was 37 years. For every 100 females, there were 92.40 males.  For every 100 females age 18 and over, there were 89.20 males.

The median income for a household in the county was $29,112, and for a family was $34,021. Males had a median income of $26,501 versus $20,280 for females. The per capita income for the county was $15,186.  About 14.90% of families and 19.40% of the population were below the poverty line, including 24.70% of those under age 18 and 16.90% of those age 65 or over.

Education
These school districts serve Shelby County:
 Center ISD
 Excelsior ISD
 Joaquin ISD (small portion in Panola County)
 San Augustine ISD (mostly in San Augustine County)
 Shelbyville ISD (small portion in Sabine County)
 Tenaha ISD (small portion in Panola County)
 Timpson ISD

Media
The Light and Champion, a news and information company, marked its 140th year of operation in 2017. It serves Shelby County, as well as Logansport, Louisiana. The Light and Champion produces a weekly print edition, a weekly free-distribution print product called The Merchandiser, operates a web site, www.lightandchampion.com, and a Facebook page. The Light and Champion is owned by Moser Community Media, based in Brenham, Texas.

Transportation

Major highways
  U.S. Highway 59
  Interstate 69 is currently under construction and will follow the current route of U.S. 59 in most places west of Tenaha.
  Interstate 369 is currently under construction and will follow the current route of U.S. 59 in most places north of Tenaha.
  U.S. Highway 84
  Interstate 69 is currently under construction and will follow the current route of U.S. 84 in most places east of Tenaha to the Louisiana state line.
  U.S. Highway 96
  State Highway 7
  State Highway 87
  State Highway 147
  Farm to Market Road 139
  Farm to Market Road 1970

US 59 goes through Shelby County.  It is planned to be upgraded to interstate standards as part of the planned Interstate 69 up to Tenaha, where the planned Interstate 369 will follow US 59 northward to both Interstate 30 and Interstate 49 in Texarkana. US 84 is planned to be upgraded to interstate standards as part of the planned Interstate 69 from Tenaha to the Louisiana state line.

Mass transportation
Greyhound Lines operates the Center Station at the Shelby County's Best Yogurt store in Center.

Communities

Cities
 Center (county seat)
 Huxley
 Joaquin
 Timpson

Town
 Tenaha

Unincorporated communities
 Arcadia
 Dreka
 Patroon
 Possum Trot
 Shelbyville

Images

Politics

See also

 National Register of Historic Places listings in Shelby County, Texas
 Recorded Texas Historic Landmarks in Shelby County
 Impact of the 2019–20 coronavirus pandemic on the meat industry in the United States

References

External links
 Shelby County Sports
 Shelby County Today webpage
 Shelby County government's website
 Shelby County in Handbook of Texas Online at the University of Texas
 History of the regulators and moderators and the Shelby County war in 1841 and 1842, hosted by the Portal to Texas History
 Shelby County Chamber of Commerce website
 Shelby County Genealogy webpage (RootsWeb)
 Shelby County Community Links

 
1836 establishments in the Republic of Texas
Populated places established in 1836